Garion is a fictional character.

Garion may also refer to:

Garion (artist)
Garion Hall